East Timorese passports are issued to citizens of East Timor to travel internationally. Until the UN finished its transitional work in East Timor, residents had to use a UN travel document to visit other countries until 2002 when the country officially became independent from UN control. 

East Timor has begun to issue biometric passports on 6 June 2017.

References

See also
 List of passports
 Visa requirements for East Timorese citizens

Passports by country
Foreign relations of East Timor